The women's 4 x 400 metres relay event at the 2003 IAAF World Indoor Championships was held on March 16.

Results

References
Results

400
4 × 400 metres relay at the World Athletics Indoor Championships
2003 in women's athletics